Events from the year 1831 in France.

Incumbents
 Monarch – Louis Philippe I

Events
10 March - The French Foreign Legion is founded.
5 July - 1831 French legislative election.
2 August - The Dutch Ten Days' Campaign against Belgium is halted by a French army.
22 November - In the first of the Canut Revolts, after a bloody battle with the military causing 600 casualties, rebellious silk workers seize Lyon.

Arts and literature
16 March - Victor Hugo's historical romantic Gothic novel Notre-Dame de Paris, known in English as The Hunchback of Notre-Dame (completed on 15 January), is published by Gosselin in Paris.
19 March - The play La Cocarde Tricolore by the Cogniard brothers introduces the term "chauvinism".
Frédéric Chopin arrives in Paris.

Births
12 March - Joseph Gérard, Roman Catholic missionary priest (died 1914)
15 April - Eugène Poubelle, lawyer and diplomat who introduces the dustbin to Paris (died 1907)
7 July - Eugène Ketterer, composer and pianist (died 1870)
17 July - Amédée Mannheim, inventor of a slide rule (died 1906)
15 August - Pierre Petit, photographer (died 1909)
12 October - Ernest Boulanger, politician and economist (died 1907)
31 October - Paul Durand-Ruel, modern art dealer (died 1922)
23 December - Marie-Azélie Guérin-Martin, Roman Catholic lay religious, canonized (died 1877)

Deaths
28 April - Charles César de Fay de La Tour-Maubourg, soldier and politician (born 1757)
12 May - Louis-Marie Aubert du Petit-Thouars, botanist (born 1758)
27 August - François Dumont, portrait miniature painter (born 1751)
14 October - Jean-Louis Pons, astronomer (born 1761)

See also

References

1830s in France